Richard Minino is a Florida-based artist.  While he does participate in gallery showings, the main outlet for his art is through creating album and T-shirt designs for numerous punk and hardcore bands.

He also plays drums for New Mexican Disaster Squad, Gatorface and No Friends. In 2008, he was announced as a member of None More Black.

References 

Living people
American artists
Year of birth missing (living people)